Franz Edler von Sonnleithner (June 1, 1905 – April 18, 1981) was a diplomat who acted as Ribbentrop's representative in Adolf Hitler's headquarters during the later years of the war with the rank of minister.

Life
He was born in Salzburg, Austria and studied law in Vienna and Innsbruck, where he gained a doctorate in 1928. He was then a police commissioner in Vienna and Salzburg and worked in the Federal Chancellery in Vienna. He was arrested as a Nazi in 1936 and remained in prison until March 12, 1938 Anschluss when Germany annexed Austria. After joining the Reich Foreign Office, he worked on the personal staff of the Foreign Minister Joachim von Ribbentrop.

He was present at the situation conference in 1944 at the Wolf's Lair headquarters in Rastenburg, East Prussia when the 20 July plot bomb was planted by Claus Von Stauffenberg. From April 1945 to 1948 he was held in American internment camps. He then worked in industry in Ingelheim am Rhein where he died aged 75.

See also
Sonnleithner

Bibliography
Sonnleithner, Franz von (1989), Als Diplomat im Fuhrerhauptquartier: Aus dem Nachlass, Langen Müller, Munich,

References

Attribution
This article is the translation of the corresponding article of the German Wikipedia. A list of contributors can be found there at the History section.

1905 births
1981 deaths
Edlers of Austria
German diplomats
People from Salzburg
German prisoners of war in World War II held by the United States